is a 1967 Japanese chambara film directed by Kimiyoshi Yasuda and starring Shintaro Katsu as the blind masseur Zatoichi. It was originally released by the Daiei Motion Picture Company (later acquired by Kadokawa Pictures).

Zatoichi's Cane Sword is the fifteenth episode in the 26-part film series devoted to the character of Zatoichi.

Plot
While travelling Zatoichi comes across a dying gangster boss called Shotaro. In a nearby town that has been overrun by gang belonging
to Boss Iwagoro, Zatoichi disturbs the gangsters' gambling scam and hides away with the town's blacksmith Senzo.
Senzo turns out to be the apprentice to the master swordsmith who forged Zatoichi's cane sword. 
Senzo spots a crack in the blade and warns that it will snap after one more kill.

At the inn where Zatoichi takes a job as a masseur, the innkeeper Gembei has taken in Shotaro's daughter Shizu and son Seikichi. 
Shizu wants her brother to take their father's place as the new boss and keep the evil Boss Iwagoro from taking over, but the 
scholarly Seikichi has no interest in the family business. During his stay at the inn Zatoichi discovers Iwagoro is in cahoots
with a corrupt government official, Inspector Kuwayama.

Cast
 Shintaro Katsu as Zatoichi
 Shiho Fujimura as Oshizu
 Eijirō Tōno as Senzo
 Yoshihiko Aoyama as Seikichi
 Tatsuo Endo as Boss Iwagoro
 Masumi Harukawa as Oryu
 Makoto Fujita as Umazo
 Kiyoko Suizenji as Oharu
 Masako Akeboshi as Matsu
 Fujio Suga as Kuwayama

Production
 Yoshinobu Nishioka - Art director

Reception

Critical response
Roger Greenspun, in a review for The New York Times, wrote that "[w]here it is quiet enough to allow Ichi his peaceful idiocyncrasies, Zato Ichi's Cane Sword is a pleasantly modest film, an amiable contrast to the fateful solemnities of the Toshiro Mifune samurai dramas. Ichi's very invulnerability makes for a certain relaxation, a few songs, a little buffoonery, and much of it to the good."

References

External links
 
 
 
"Zatoichi the Blind Swordsman, Vol. 15 - Zatoichi's Cane Sword", review by J. Doyle Wallis for DVD Talk (28 May 2004)
Zatoichi's Cane Sword, review by Judge Dan Mancini for DVD Verdict (8 June 2004)
Zatoichi's Cane Sword (1967), review by D. Trull for Lard Biscuit Enterprises
Zatoichi's Cane Sword (1967), review by Hubert for Unseen Films (17 February 2014)
Review: Zatoichi's Cane Sword (1966), by Thomas Raven for freakengine (February 2012)
Zatoichi's Cane Sword – A Complicated Story, Well Told, review by Trash Cinema Club (22 April 2014)

Japanese adventure films
1967 films
Zatoichi films
Daiei Film films
Films set in Japan
Films shot in Japan
Films scored by Ichirō Saitō
1960s Japanese films